Ernest Denny Logie Danson (14 June 18809 December 1946) was an Anglican bishop in the first half of the 20th century.

Biography 
He was born into a distinguished clerical family — his father was Myers Danson, Dean of Aberdeen and Orkney —  on 14 June 1880 and educated at Trinity College, Glenalmond and Aberdeen University. He was ordained deacon in 1906 and priest in 1907 and began his career with  a curacy at St Paul's Cathedral, Dundee. From 1906 he was a Missionary Priest in  Southeast Asia eventually becoming Bishop of Labuan and Sarawak.

He then returned to England as a Canon Residentiary of Carlisle Cathedral and Assistant Bishop of Carlisle (both 1931–1938) before being appointed Provost of St Mary's Cathedral, Edinburgh and an Assistant Bishop of Edinburgh. He was then elected diocesan Bishop of Edinburgh in 1939. Four years later he was elected Primus of Scotland; ill-health caused him to resign as Primus in May 1946, and to resign his See in September before his death on 9 December 1946.

References

1880 births
People educated at Glenalmond College
Alumni of the University of Aberdeen
Anglican bishops of Labuan and Sarawak
Provosts of St Mary's Cathedral, Edinburgh (Episcopal)
Bishops of Edinburgh
Primuses of the Scottish Episcopal Church
20th-century Anglican bishops in Asia
1946 deaths
British expatriates in Malaysia
Scottish Anglican missionaries
Anglican missionaries in Malaysia
Anglican missionaries in Singapore
People from British Borneo